is a railway station on the Chikuhō Main Line operated by JR Kyushu in Iizuka, Fukuoka Prefecture, Japan.

Lines

Station layout 
The station, which is unstaffed, consists of two side platforms serving two tracks. A station building in a traditional log house design houses a waiting room and automatic ticket vending machines. Access to the opposite platform from the station building is by means of a level crossing which has steps at both ends. On the other side of the tracks from the station building is a separate entrance to the station. This is a flight of steps up a hill slope from the main road and leads directly to platform 2.

Adjacent stations

History 
The station was opened by JR Kyushu on 11 March 1989 as an additional station on the existing Chikuhō Main Line track.

Passenger statistics
In fiscal 2016, the daily average number of passengers using the station (boarding passengers only) was above 100 and below 323. The station did not rank among the top 300 busiest stations of JR Kyushu.

References

External links
Urata Station (JR Kyushu)

Railway stations in Fukuoka Prefecture
Railway stations in Japan opened in 1989